Canwell Priory was a medieval monastic house in Staffordshire, England, founded ca. 1140.

References

Monasteries in Staffordshire